Rayman 2: The Great Escape is a 1999 platform video game developed by Ubi Pictures and published by Ubi Soft for the Nintendo 64, Microsoft Windows, Sega Dreamcast and Sony PlayStation. An enhanced port titled Rayman Revolution (Rayman 2: Revolution in North America) was developed by Ubi Soft Annecy for the PlayStation 2. An alternative remake known as Rayman 2 Forever was developed by Ubi Soft Milan for the Game Boy Color. 

The game centers on the character Rayman, who is tasked with saving the fantastical land of the Fairy Glade from an army of robotic pirates led by Admiral Razorbeard. 

Rayman 2 was critically acclaimed for its gameplay, graphics and accessibility.

Gameplay 

The game is played from a third-person perspective and the player has control over the camera, though in some situations this control is limited to only certain angles. At several points in the game the player loses control during cut scenes, which typically show dialogue between characters.

By collecting lums (small bodies, or shards of magical energy), the player unlocks more information about the game world and its back story, which can be read by standing still and pressing a specific button for some time. Some back story is also obtained through (optional) instructions from Murfy, a "flying encyclopaedia" who provides explanations on all kinds of gameplay elements.

In contrast to its predecessor, which was a 2D platformer, Rayman 2 is a 3D platformer. The player navigates through a mostly linear sequence of levels, fighting enemy Robo-Pirates, solving puzzles and collecting lums. Collecting enough lums gains the player access to new parts of the world. Part of the lums are hidden in small cages, in which other freedom fighters or Teensies are imprisoned, and can be obtained by breaking the cages.

Rayman starts the game with minimal abilities, and he can gain more abilities as the game progresses. The main weapon available in the game is Rayman's fist, with which energy orbs can be shot. Eventually, the orbs can be charged before shooting them, making them more powerful. Rayman can also enter a strafing stance which allows him to easily aim orbs whilst avoiding enemy attacks. Rayman later gains the ability to swing over large gaps using Purple Lums. Rayman is also able to use his helicopter hair to slow his descent while jumping, with some segments later in the game allowing him to fly with his hair. There are also various items Rayman can use throughout the game, such as explosive barrels he can throw, giant plums he can ride on to carry him across dangerous surfaces, and rockets he must ride on to access new areas.

In addition to the main, story-based level sequence, there are also several levels in which the player can gain bonuses in a time trial. Additionally, by collecting all lums and breaking all cages in a level, the player unlocks a bonus level in which one of Globox's children races against a robot pirate. When the player controlling the child wins the race, Rayman gains health or a powerup.

Plot

Setting 
Rayman 2 takes place in a world called the Glade of Dreams, and revolves around its invasion and occupation by an armada of interstellar Robo-Pirates, led by Admiral Razorbeard. Prior to the invasion, the Robo-Pirates destroyed over one hundred planets in the galaxy, with the intention of enslaving their inhabitants. Upon the invasion of the Glade of Dreams, the Robo-Pirates were battled against by Rayman, Globox, and other allies. After some battles, Rayman's capture occurs after the explosion of the Primordial Core. Ly the Fairy telepathically communicates with Rayman explaining the consequences of the damage, with the core's shattering into 1000 Yellow Lums, and the capture of many fighters. Rayman's powers are also lost due to this, and he finds himself captured by the Robo-Pirates at the beginning of the game.

Story 

The destruction of the world's core greatly weakens and disables Rayman's powers, which leads to his subsequent capture and imprisonment aboard the Buccaneer, a prison ship. Globox, a friend of Rayman, is also captured and put in the same cell as Rayman aboard the Buccaneer. Globox gives Rayman a Silver Lum given to him by Ly the fairy, which temporarily restores some of his powers. Rayman escapes the prison ship through a chute, however during the escape he once again separates from Globox. After falling from the ship, Rayman eventually finds himself in the Woods of Light. Rayman decides that his best chance is to find Ly, and begins his search through the forest. He comes across Murfy, a "flying encyclopaedia", who serves as Rayman's guide throughout the game, as well as three of Globox's children. Rayman sadly informs them of his separation with Globox, much to their dismay. The children inform Rayman that Ly has been captured by Robo-Pirates and has been taken deeper into the forest.

Traversing deeper into the forest, Rayman frees a group of Teensies—small creatures with magical abilities—who were locked in a cage. After bickering amongst themselves about who among them is their king, they inform Rayman of the Ly's location in a stronghold within the Fairy Glade. They allow Rayman access to the Hall of Doors for the cost of some Yellow Lums. Once collected, the King Teensie creates a network of portals that connect the Hall of Doors, which Rayman uses in order to access various areas throughout the Glade of Dreams. Eventually, Rayman finds Ly being held captive in a force field within the Fairy Glade. After being freed, Rayman tells Ly of his separation with Globox and his loss of powers. Due to the destruction of the Heart of the World, Ly is unable to restore Rayman's powers. However, she tells Rayman of four ancient masks, through which Polokus, the spirit of the world, must be awakened in order to defeat the Robo-Pirates. The four masks are hidden in secret sanctuaries consisting of the four elements; water/ice, earth/stone, fire, and air. Ly informs Rayman that his only hope is to find the four masks, defeat their guardians, and awaken Polokus.

Concerned by Rayman's progress, Admiral Razorbeard dispatches several warships to pursue and kill him. Rayman approaches the entrance to the Sanctuary of Water and Ice, the location in which the first of the four masks is contained. He defeats its guardian, Axel, in combat and collects the first mask, which teleports him to the realm where Polokus rests eternally. Speaking to Rayman through his dreams, Polokus congratulates him on his find, and urges him to collect the three remaining masks. Rayman travels to the Menhir Hills, where he learns to tame and ride equine-like walking shells. Rayman acquaintances himself with Clark, a friendly giant, who has become terminally ill after accidentally swallowing a Robo-Pirate. He asks Rayman to retrieve the Elixir of Life from the Cave of Bad Dreams, a realm which can only be accessed if the occupant is asleep. Rayman asks a witch doctor to hypnotise him, which transports him to the Cave of Bad Dreams. Once there, Jano, the guardian of the dream world, offers Rayman the choice of eternal wealth instead of taking the elixir. If the player accepts Jano's offer, a humorous ending will play, which depicts an overweight Rayman stranded on a small island, surrounded by treasure. Declining the offer will grant Rayman the elixir, which he uses to cure Clark.

Afterwards, Rayman reunites with Globox, who was captured by Robo-Pirates and brought to a remote detention facility. Globox reveals that he received another Silver Lum, which greatly enhances Rayman's offensive capabilities. After destroying a warship with his new powers, Rayman travels to Whale Bay, where he frees a benevolent whale, Carmen, who has been imprisoned by the pirates in order to use her blubber to oil the engines of their ships. Carmen informs Rayman of the second mask's location, which is situated in the Sanctuary of Stone and Fire. Its guardian, Umber, is an inanimate statue which Rayman uses to control in order to walk across lava and obtain the second mask. Once obtained and given to Polokus, Razorbeard becomes infuriated with Rayman's success and orders numerous fleets of warships to kill him. A group of warships ambush Rayman in a mountainous precipice and almost kill him, however he ultimately escapes.

Rayman arrives at The Sanctuary of Rock and Lava, and obtains a new power from Ly which gives him the ability to fly. However the guardian of the sanctuary, Foutch, wounds Rayman which causes him to lose his ability of flight. After defeating him and obtaining the third mask, Polokus teleports Rayman to the Iron Mountains, which houses a vast network of mines. Rayman encounters Uglette, wife of Globox, who is in despair after informing Rayman that dozens of her children are being used for labour in the mines, and Globox has once again been captured and sent to the Buccaneer. Rayman hijacks a warship and rescues all of Globox's children from the mines. As Uglette and the children leave, one of the children passes Rayman the fourth mask, claiming that they found it in the mines. Rayman departs to see Polokus, who congratulates him on his work, and uses the power of all four masks to awaken himself. Polokus tells Rayman that he can destroy all Robo-Pirates in the Glade of Dreams, but he has no power in the air. Polokus then creates a portal which leads Rayman to the airborne Buccaneer, in which he must defeat Admiral Razorbeard and save Globox.

On board the Buccaneer, a general visits Razorbeard, who presents to him the Grolgoth, a large powered exoskeleton which makes the user invulnerable to damage. Razorbeard purchases it, and plans for his final confrontation with Rayman. Soon after, Rayman infiltrates the Buccaneer and finds both Razorbeard (housed inside the Grolgoth) and Globox in the crow's nest of the ship. During combat, Razorbeard accidentally collapses the floor, plunging both him and Rayman into a lava-filled furnace. During the descent, Ly telepathically saves Rayman from his fall and creates him a sentient flying shell, which he uses to knock the Grolgoth into the lava. Razorbeard escapes the ship in a small shuttlecraft, and initiates the self-destruct, which destroys the Buccaneer with Rayman still inside. Later, at Rayman's funeral, all gather for a memorial service. They could only recover Rayman's left shoe, however, the shoe suddenly appears to react to an oncoming presence, as a limping, one-footed Rayman emerges nearby, much to the joy of everyone present.

Versions 
Rayman 2 was released on a wide variety of platforms, with several differences and name changes between the versions.

Nintendo 64 and Microsoft Windows 
The Nintendo 64 version of Rayman 2: The Great Escape was released first, followed by a Microsoft Windows release later that year, with improvements made to the Microsoft Windows version (mainly relating to graphics, sound, music and texture quality).

The Nintendo 64 version of the game was ported to the Nintendo DS by DC Studios under the title Rayman DS on 24 March 2005. Very few changes have been made to the game from the Nintendo 64 version. Parts of some music tracks have been taken out and some graphical textures have been simplified. The port also added touch screen controls.

On 26 May 2011, GOG.com re-released Rayman 2: The Great Escape, alongside Rayman 3: Hoodlum Havoc and Rayman Forever, made to be compatible with Windows XP, Windows Vista, and Windows 7, along with a digital version of the game's soundtrack as bonus content. On 26 January 2012 Ubisoft announced that Rayman 2 would be added as a bonus for preordering the Microsoft Windows version of Rayman Origins.

Dreamcast 
The Dreamcast version has various changes from the Nintendo 64 and Microsoft Windows versions, including several 2D sprites being replaced by 3D models, improved texture quality and minor level design changes. The Dreamcast version also has exclusive mini-games, six hidden Glob Crystal collectables and replaces The Hall of Doors with The Isle of Doors for the world map. Michel Ancel has previously stated that he believes that this version is the best version of the game.

The Dreamcast version of the game was later ported to iOS devices in March 2010 (which was later removed from the App Store in late 2013), and the Nintendo 3DS in March 2011. Both ports lack the Globox Village and minigames present in the Dreamcast release.

PlayStation 
The PlayStation version was developed by Ubi Soft Shanghai, and is the first version to have the characters speaking real languages (English, French, German, Spanish and Italian), replacing the gibberish spoken by the characters originally. Numerous level design changes were made, and some levels and cutscenes (namely the fake ending seen if the player accepts Jano's offer) were removed altogether. There are only 800 Yellow Lums in this version, with the scene of Razorbeard eating a Yellow Lum being changed so that he would eat a Red Lum instead. Characters like the Ninjaws mini-boss that first appears at the end of The Sanctuary of Stone and Fire are exclusive to this version, and characters that did not have speaking roles before, such as the guardians Axel, Umber, and Foutch, now speak to Rayman when he confronts them.

This port was later released on the PlayStation Network on 18 December 2008 in North America and on 28 July 2010 in Europe.

PlayStation 2 
This version, titled Rayman: Revolution (Rayman 2: Revolution in North America), was developed by Ubi Soft Annecy and released on 22 December 2000. It features many enhancements including new minigames and bonus challenges, upgrades to Rayman's abilities, level revisions, new music tracks, the option to switch between the gibberish from other versions and newly recorded real language voices, three new bosses, and Yellow Lum redistribution. The Hall of Doors was replaced with three central hubs, called The Minisaurus Plain, Globox's House and The Rainbow Creek, in which to walk to each level freely, play Ly's bonus challenges unlocked by freeing Revolution-exclusive prisoners called Familiar Spirits, and purchase ability upgrades or the new minigames from the Teensies with the Yellow Lums the player has collected.

To date, Revolution is the only edition of Rayman 2 that lets players save when a level has been only partially completed, but like all versions of the game, it still uses manual saves. This is also the only version in which the 1,000th Yellow Lum can be obtained normally, and hence actually changes the total back to 1,000 despite Razorbeard still eating it and the total changing to 999/999. The 1,000th Lum is obtained after beating a mind-controlled Clark and receiving the Lums Radar, a magnet-shaped gadget exclusive to Revolution that helps players track down any missed Yellow Lums.

This port was later released on the PlayStation Network on 1 May 2012 in North America.

Game Boy Color 
Titled Rayman 2 Forever (Rayman 2 in North America), this version was developed by Ubi Soft Milan. It is a 2D side scroller, and follows the story of the other versions. It was released in December 2001 in Europe and January 2002 in North America. It has two identical boss fights. The second boss is Razorbeard, even though the sprite for a common Robo Pirate is used. Ly and Globox appear only in cutscenes. Like the PS1 version, Rayman has to collect 800 Lums instead of 1000.

Development 

Rayman 2 was originally conceptualised as a sidescrolling 2D platformer, like the first game. Development on the prototype began in early 1996 with a team of six people and a budget of 10 million francs. It was slated to be released on the PlayStation, Sega Saturn, and Microsoft Windows in the fourth quarter of that year. The prototype of Rayman 2 featured some usage of prerendered bitmaps of 3D computer models, differing from the hand painted presentation of its predecessor, beginning in 1998. A prototype containing a single level is playable in the final PlayStation version of the game if the player completes a certain percentage of the game. The PC was the original lead platform, but mid-development, they switched to Nintendo 64, necessitating reducing the quality of the textures. The Dreamcast version uses the original high-quality textures. The art design was inspired by the works of Hayao Miyazaki and Tex Avery, and was made to give the game's world a sense of mythology.

Reception 

Rayman 2 received critical acclaim upon release.

Jeff Lundrigan reviewed the Nintendo 64 version of the game for Next Generation, rating it four stars out of five, and stated that "with its cute character designs and slick, polished gameplay, Rayman 2 is one of the few titles that can honestly claim to have something to offer any gamer of any age or skill."

Rayman 2 computer version received a "Silver" sales award from the Entertainment and Leisure Software Publishers Association (ELSPA), indicating sales of at least 100,000 copies in the United Kingdom.

Rayman 2 received acclaim from both critics and fans, scoring a 9 on Nintendo 64, 9.2 on Microsoft Windows and PlayStation and 9.6 on Dreamcast from IGN. It also received 'IGN Dreamcast Game of the Year 2000'. It was praised in most aspects including gameplay, audio, graphics and controls, praising the colourful, vibrant worlds, the soundtrack, and the varied gameplay. IGN's Brandon Justice called it "the most impressive feat of game design and execution the platforming genre has ever seen."
Rayman 2 was nominated for GameSpot "Personal Computer Action Game of the Year" award in 1999, which ultimately went to Unreal Tournament.

Jeff Lundrigan reviewed the Dreamcast version of the game for Next Generation, rating it four stars out of five, and stated that "Just go out and buy it. You won't be disappointed." The Dreamcast version was a runner-up for GameSpots annual "Best Platform Game" award, which went to Banjo-Tooie.

Revolution was a runner-up for GameSpots annual "Best Platform Game" award among console games, which went to Conker's Bad Fur Day.

The reception for Rayman DS was mixed or average, citing graphical flaws and camera problems. While it did support controlling the game via the touchpad, this was regarded as both sloppy and awkward, partly caused by the game being a direct port of the Nintendo 64 version. Rayman 3D got a similarly mixed reception due to it being a direct port of the Dreamcast release, with no true usage of the 3DS's capabilities except for stereoscopic 3D.

GameSpot and IGN have included Rayman 2 in their "greatest video games" lists.

References 

1999 video games
3D platform games
Alien invasions in video games
Cancelled Sega Saturn games
Dark fantasy video games
Dreamcast games
Game Boy Color games
IOS games
Nintendo 3DS eShop games
Nintendo 3DS games
Nintendo 64 games
Nintendo DS games
PlayStation (console) games
PlayStation 2 games
PlayStation Network games
2: The Great Escape
RenderWare games
Video games about robots
Single-player video games
Steampunk video games
Video games about size change
Video games about dreams
Video games about pirates
Video games directed by Michel Ancel
Video games developed in France
Video games developed in Italy
Video games developed in China
Video games with alternate endings
Video games with alternative versions
Windows games
Gameloft games